Itacurubi is a municipality of the western part of the state of Rio Grande do Sul, Brazil. The population is 3,460 (2020 est.) in an area of 1,120.87 km². Its elevation is 169 m.  The name comes from the Tupi language. It is located 627 km west of the state capital of Porto Alegre, northeast of Alegrete.

References

External links
 Official Web Page 
 www.citybrazil.com  

Municipalities in Rio Grande do Sul